Larix europaea can refer to:

Larix europaea DC., a synonym of Larix decidua var. decidua
Larix europaea Middend., a synonym of Larix sibirica Ledeb.